Andrea II Muzaka, was an Albanian noble of the Muzaka family and the ruler of the Principality of Muzaka. His grandfather is known as one of the first notable rulers of the principality and also the titular "Marshal of Albania". His father was Teodor I Muzaka or "Keshetsi" (Gërshetësi) which means "the one with braided hair". Andrea Muzaka as a noble person of the Muzaka family became the ruler of the principality after his father's death around 1331. Andrea is known as a prominent medieval Albanian noble and a hero who defeated the king Vukašin in a great battle thus promoting the nobility of the family's rule into a Despotate, being one of the main symbols of resistance against the short-lived growing empire of Serbia, and also significantly expanding the principality of Muzaka in southern Albania.

Rule

First reign 

Andrea II Muzaka came from the noble family of Muzaka, who were wealthy in southern Albania. His grandfather Andrea I Muzaka established a de facto independent territorial rule around 1280 in the area Myzeqe west of Berat, later named after the family. After Andrea I, the next ruler would become Teodor or "Këshetsi", Teodor's son, Andrea II would become the most prominent ruler of the Muzaka noble family in medieval era. Andrea like his father served the Angevins as the marshal of Albania, however, he held various other titles such as sebastokrator, and even granter tittle such as despotus Regni Albaniae (despot of Albania) by the Anjous. At the beginning of his rule he exercised nominal rule over much of the country of Adriatic sea between Vjosa and Devoll rivers eastwards but in practice this continued to be dominated by the historic Albanian noble families who paid little heed to Muzaka's authority.

Andrea held alliance both diplomatic and friendship with the Angevins, other noble members of family were always allowed to go to Durrës which at that time was held by the Anjou-durrazo family. According to the medieval Albanian historian Gjon Muzaka, Andrea would defeat the King Vukasin in a great battle, therefor in his honor it would be given to him the second highest title below to Emperor, that of Despot by the Emperor of the Byzantine Empire, which he had been a great threat to him and his nominal weakening Empire, as well as the coat of arms of the Muzaka family would be replaced with the new double-headed eagle flag

As soon as Andrea II Muzaka had obtained the title of despot, he endorsed an anti-Byzantine revolt (1335-1341) in his domains, and also formed an alliance with the Anjou from Naples on 30 December 1336, whereas he was recognized as a vassal of Robert, Prince of Taranto. As proof of his fidelity to the Capetian House of Anjou, Andrea II Muzaka had to leave one of his sons as hostage in Durazzo.

Resistance against the Serbians 

During the period 1341-1347 the Byzantine Empire was going through a deep civil war which hastened the Serbians to take advantage out of it and start an invasion all over into the southern Balkans. The despot Andrea held great resistance and formed various alliances with other Albanian noble families and with the Anjou as well. In 1336, the short-lived Serbian Empire under Stefan Dušan captured Angevin-controlled Durazzo. Although Angevins managed to recapture Durazzo, Dušan continued his expansion, and in the period of 1337—45 he had captured Kanina and Valona (in modern-day southern Albania). Andrea Muzaka waged against the Serbian forces around 1340 and his forces managed to defeat the Serbian army at the Pelister mountain. Andrea Muzaka with an alliance with the Gropa family would have several other successful campaigns against Dusan, however although in a short period of time his domains like with the other Albanian principalities would eventually be invaded by the Serbian King.

Second reign 
After the death of Stefan Dušan in 1355 and collapse of the short-lived Serbian Empire, the despot Andrea regained control over parts of the south-eastern modern-day Albania and significantly expanded the principality over northern Greece with Kastoria after the Battle of Marica in 1371 which he had captured from Prince Marko. One year latter Andrea would die in 1372 and the rule would be passed to his son Teodor II, he would be buried with his wife in St. Anthony Church, Durrës

Family

Andrea II married Lady Euphemia Matranga also called: Eythvmia, Etinia or Onorata); who was the daughter of Paul Matranga, Lord of Ghora. The couple had five children: 

•Gjin Muzaka (* around 1337; † 1389), who inherited most of his fathers lands, with the exception of Berat, Myzeqe and Castoria. He married Lady Suina Arianiti-Comneniates, a daughter of Lord Materango Arianiti, with whom he had 5 sons: 

- Andrew III Muzaka- Materango Muzaka-  Blaise Muzaka-  Bogdan Muzaka-  Laldi Muzaka                                
Teodor II Muzaka (* 1337; † after 1389), who inherited Myzeqe and Berat 
Lord Stoia († after 1384), who inherited Kastoria as well as  its villages and estates. Unfortunately, he died early with no heirs, therefore his lands were passed down to his elder brother Gjin.
 Lady Comita Muzaka († 1392)
 Lady Chiranna Muzaka (also: Kyranna), who married Lord Groppa of Ohër and Dibra. The couple had no living issue, thus their property was inherited by the Muzakas.
Despot Andrea II and his wife Despotess Euphemia were both buried in the town of Durrës, within the Church of Saint Anthony, to the right side of the main altar, in a beautiful grave made of marble and containing the following epitaph : 'Here lies Lord Andrew Molosachi, Despot of Epirus'.

See also
 Muzaka Family

References

1319 births
1372 deaths
14th-century Albanian people
Albanian soldiers
History of Berat

Sources